Mike Holding (born 30 May 1958) is a Kenyan-born, British filmmaker, cameraman, director and wildlife consultant.

Life and career
Born in Nairobi, Kenya, Holding was educated at Abingdon School in Oxfordshire, England. He then studied zoology at the University of Exeter.

Based in Botswana, he was the director, producer and cameraman for several episodes of the BBC Natural World TV series including "A Wild Dog's Story", which was a nominated finalist in the 2002 Royal Television Society awards  and the "Elephants without Borders" episode in February 2009, which was Emmy nominated by Animal Planet in three categories.

Holding was also a principal cameraman for many of the sequences in the Disneynature feature films "Elephant" and "Earth" and the "From Pole to Pole" episode of the BBC series Planet Earth, which won best photography at the BAFTAs. Holding has served as principal wildlife cameraman on numerous high end blue chip natural history films and TV series for some 35 years. Specialities include long lens camerawork and drone cinematography.

With nearly 45 years of flying experience, Mike pilots his own Cessna 182 aircraft for aerial camerawork and for reconnaissance and supply runs to crews in remote areas. A passionate conservationist, Mike dedicates a lot of time when not filming to assisting researchers with aerial surveys.

Productions

See also
 List of Old Abingdonians
 imdb https://pro.imdb.com/name/nm2145817/credits

References

imdb credits

1958 births
Living people
Alumni of the University of Exeter
English cinematographers
English film directors
British filmmakers
English people of Kenyan descent
People educated at Abingdon School